Allen Douglas Price (born 24 March 1968) is a Welsh former footballer who played as a full-back in the Football League for Cardiff City.

Born in Gelligaer, Price played junior football with Newport County and was a youth international for Wales. He joined Cardiff City in August 1985, where he made two appearances.

References

1968 births
Living people
People from Gelligaer
Sportspeople from Caerphilly County Borough
Welsh footballers
Wales youth international footballers
Newport County A.F.C. players
Cardiff City F.C. players
Association football fullbacks
English Football League players